Mykhailo Vitaliyovych Zabrodskyi (born 24 January 1973) is a Ukrainian politician and retired military officer. A member of the European Solidarity party, he was elected to the Verkhovna Rada (Ukraine's national parliament) in 2019, but renounced his mandate in March 2023.

Zabrodskyi is a former commander of the Ukrainian Airmobile Forces, a lieutenant general, and a Hero of Ukraine. He commanded the 95th Airmobile Brigade during the War in Donbass, during which it conducted a 470-kilometer raid 170 kilometers into Russian and separatist-held territory.

Early life 
Zabrodskyi was born on 24 January 1973 in Dnipropetrovsk, the son of a military officer.  In 1989 graduated from high school.

Military career 

From 1989 to 1994 he received military education in St. Petersburg - A.F. Mozhaysky Military-Space Academy, after which he served for five years in military service under a contract in Russia. After returning to Ukraine he began serving in the 95th Separate Airmobile Brigade as a platoon commander.

In 2005–2006, he was a student at the United States Army Command and General Staff College.

In the 2014 summer, the 95th Brigade, commanded by Zabrodsky, carried out a raid in the enemy's rear. Within two weeks, performing combat missions, Zabrodskyi's crew passed 470 km from Sloviansk to Mariupol, then along the Russian-Ukrainian border, and through Luhansk returned to Sloviansk. According to American military expert Philip A. Karber, this was the longest raid of armed formation in latest history.

On August 24, 2014, he commanded a combined parade battalion of ATO participants at Parade on Independence Day.

On 1 August 2015, he was promoted to major general. Zabrodskyi was Commander of the Landing and Assault Troops from 2015 to 2019.

In 2017 Zabrodskyi was First Deputy Head of the Anti-Terrorist Center at the Security Service of Ukraine (SBU) and Head of the Antyterrorist Operation in Donetsk Oblast and Luhansk Oblast.

On 9 November 2017, Ukrainian President Petro Poroshenko announced on his Facebook page that Zabrodskyi was appointed to lead the antiterrorist forces (ATO). At the same time, during the course of one of the largest rotations in the Anti-terrorist Operation Zone (ATO Zone), several brigades of the Air Assault Forces, including the 25th Airborne and 79th Airborne Assault, entered the collision line.

After being elected into parliament, Zabrodskyi was succeeded as commander of the Airborne Assault Troops in August 2019 by Major General Yevhen Moisiuk.

Political career
On 29 September 2015 Zabrodskyi was registered as the first candidate (leading the list) for a seat in the Zhytomyr Oblast Council, affiliated with the Petro Poroshenko Bloc "Solidarity". He was elected to a five-year term as a deputy to the Seventh Convocation of the council on 25 October that year, and serves as a member of the standing committee on regulation, deputy activity, local government, legality, law enforcement, and anti-corruption activities.

In the July 2019 Ukrainian parliamentary election Zabrodskyi was placed fourth on the party list of European Solidarity (the party formerly named Petro Poroshenko Bloc "Solidarity"). He was elected to parliament. He is the First Deputy Chairman of the parliament's National Security, Defense, and Intelligence Committee.

In parliament Zabrodskyi became a member of the group for inter-parliamentary relations with the Italian Republic.

Zabrodskyi renounced his parliamentary mandate in March 2023. On 17 March 2023 Zabrodskyi's request to vote for the termination of his mandate was registered in parliament. On 20 March 2023 parliament deprived him of his mandate. According to former (European Solidarity) parliamentary faction colleague Oleksiy Honcharenko Zabrodskyi would be returning to military service.

Personal life 
Zabrodskyi speaks English fluently.

See also 
 Victor Nikolyuk

References

External links 
 https://web.archive.org/web/20140826114136/http://ukrgeroes.narod.ru/ZabrodskyMV.htm
 https://web.archive.org/web/20140826113616/http://www.president.gov.ua/news/31072.html
 http://ukrpohliad.org/analytics/rejd-desantny-kiv-95-yi-bry-gady-po-ty-lah-voroga.html

1973 births
Military personnel from Dnipro
Lieutenant generals of Ukraine
Recipients of the title of Hero of Ukraine
Living people
Ukrainian military personnel of the war in Donbas
Ninth convocation members of the Verkhovna Rada
Politicians from Dnipro
Non-U.S. alumni of the Command and General Staff College
Recipients of the Order of Danylo Halytsky
Recipients of the Order of Bohdan Khmelnytsky, 3rd class
Recipients of the Order of Gold Star (Ukraine)